Eighth is ordinal form of the number eight.

Eighth may refer to:
 One eighth,  or ⅛, a fraction, one of eight equal parts of a whole
 Eighth note (quaver), a musical note played for half the value of a quarter note (crotchet)
 Octave, an interval between seventh and ninth
 Eighth octave C, a C note
 Eighth Lake, a lake by Inlet, New York

See also 
 1/8 (disambiguation)
 8 (disambiguation)
 The 8th (disambiguation)
 The Eighth Day (disambiguation)